Bouchercon is an annual convention of creators and devotees of mystery and detective fiction. It is named in honour of writer, reviewer, and editor Anthony Boucher; also the inspiration for the Anthony Awards, which have been issued at the convention since 1986. This page details Bouchercon XXVI and the 10th Anthony Awards ceremony.

Bouchercon
The convention was held at the Broadway Media Centre in Nottingham, England on September 28, 1995; running until the October 1. The event was chaired by Adrian Wooton, organiser of the Shots in the Dark mystery convention.

Special Guests
Lifetime Achievement award — Ruth Rendell
International Guest of Honor — James Ellroy
British Guest of Honor — Colin Dexter
Fan Guest of Honor — Geoff Bradley
Toastmaster — Reginald Hill

Anthony Awards
The following list details the awards distributed at the tenth annual Anthony Awards ceremony.

Novel award
Winner:
Sharyn McCrumb, She Walks These Hills

Shortlist:
Michael Connelly, The Concrete Blonde
Lionel Davidson, Kolymsky Heights
Janet Evanovich, One for the Money
Sue Grafton, "K" Is for Killer
Batya Gur, Murder on a Kibbutz
Reginald Hill, Pictures of Perfection
Lynda La Plante, Cold Shoulde]
John Lescroart, The 13th Juror
Val McDermid, Crack Down
Walter Mosley, Black Betty
Derek Raymond, Not Till the Red Fog Rises
Janwillem van de Wetering, Just a Corpse at Twilight

First novel award
Winner:
Caleb Carr, The Alienist

Shortlist:
David Guterson, Snow Falling on Cedars
Alex Keegan, Cuckoo
Dennis Lehane, A Drink Before the War
Carol O'Connell, Mallory's Oracle
Laura Joh Rowland, Shinjū
Michelle Spring, Every Breath You Take
Doug J. Swanson, Big Town
Chris West, Death of a Blue Lantern

Short story award
Winner:
Sharyn McCrumb, "The Monster of Glamis", from Royal Crimes

Shortlist:
Robert Barnard, "The Gentleman in the Lake", from Ellery Queen's Mystery Magazine June 1994
Ed Gorman, "One of Those Days, One of Those Nights", from Crime Yellow
Ian Rankin, "A Deep Hole", from London Noir

Critical / Non-fiction award
Winner:
John Cooper & B.A. Pike, Detective Fiction: The Collector's Guide

Shortlist:
William L. DeAndrea, Encyclopedia Mysteriosa
Martin H. Greenberg, The Tony Hillerman Companion
Rosemary Herbert, The Fatal Art of Entertainment

True crime award
Winner:
David Canter, Criminal Shadows: Inside the Mind of the Serial Killer

Shortlist:
Mikal Gilmore, Shot in the Heart
G. Russell Girardin & William J. Helmer, Dillinger, The Untold Story
Simon Rae, The Faber Book of Murder
Philip Sugden, The Complete History of Jack the Ripper

Short story collection / anthology award
Winner:
Tony Hillerman, The Mysterious West

Shortlist:
James Ellroy, Hollywood Nocturnes
Ed Gorman, A Modern Treasury of Great Detective Stories
Maxim Jakubowski, London Noir
Michele Slung & Roland Hartman, Murder for Halloween: Tales of Suspense

Movie award
Winner:
Pulp Fiction

Shortlist:
The Client
Disclosure
The Last Seduction
Shallow Grave (1994 film)

Television series award
Winner:
Prime Suspect

Shortlist:
Between the Lines
Cracker
Homicide: Life on the Streets
N.Y.P.D. Blue

References

Anthony Awards
26
1995 in England